People's University may refer to 

 People's University (Bhopal), located in  Madhya Pradesh, India
 People's University of Bangladesh, located in Dhaka
 People's University of Amsterdam, located in Holland
 University of Colima, located in Colima, Mexico
 Peoples University of Medical and Health Sciences for Women, located in Sind, Pakistan
 People's University of China (now known as Renmin University of China), located in Beijing